The Shelby Rhinehart Bridge is a steel arch bridge built in 1981. It carries Tennessee State Route 156 over the Tennessee River. It connects South Pittsburg, Tennessee to New Hope, Tennessee.

See also
 
 
 
 List of crossings of the Tennessee River

Bridges over the Tennessee River
Bridges completed in 1981
Road bridges in Tennessee
Buildings and structures in Marion County, Tennessee
Steel bridges in the United States